Jake Davis (born January 3, 2002) is an American professional soccer player who plays for Sporting Kansas City in Major League Soccer.

Davis joined the Sporting Kansas City Academy in 2017, where he made a total of 54 appearances with eight goals with the club's U-17 and U-19 teams. Davis made his professional debut with Sporting Kansas City II on April 6, 2019 in a 4–3 loss against the Bethlehem Steel F.C., where he recorded an assist. On June 30, 2020, Davis again signed an academy contract to play with Sporting Kansas City II without forfeiting his NCAA eligibility.

On August 19, 2021, Davis signed a homegrown player contract with Sporting's Major League Soccer team.

Notes

References

External links 

 Sporting KC profile 
 

2002 births
Living people
American soccer players
Sporting Kansas City II players
Sporting Kansas City players
Association football midfielders
People from Rochester, Michigan
Soccer players from Michigan
USL Championship players
Homegrown Players (MLS)
Sportspeople from Oakland County, Michigan
Major League Soccer players
MLS Next Pro players